Mark P. Shea (born August 5, 1958) is an American author, blogger, and speaker working in the field of Roman Catholic apologetics.

Born on August 5, 1958, and raised in Everett, Washington, Shea describes himself as a "double-jump convert[,] raised more or less as an agnostic pagan, [who] became a non-denominational Evangelical in 1979, and entered the Catholic Church in 1987".

Blogging 
Since June 2020, Shea has maintained the Stumbling Toward Heaven, blog. From April 2002 until May 2020, he wrote the Catholic and Enjoying It!, blog.

Books 
This is My Body: An Evangelical Discovers the Real Presence (Christendom Press, 1993) 
By What Authority?: An Evangelical Discovers Catholic Tradition (Ignatius Press, 1996) 
Making Senses Out of Scripture: Reading the Bible as the First Christians Did (Basilica Press, 1999) 
Shaken by Scandals: Catholics Speak Out About Priests' Sexual Abuse (Charis Books, 2002).  (Contributed "Chapter 9 - Dark Hour: The Long Good Friday of 2002") 
Tolkien on Film: Essays on Peter Jackson's 'The Lord of the Rings''' (Mythopoeic Press, 2004).  (Contributed "The Lord of the Rings: A Source-Critical Analysis")A Guide to the Passion: 100 Questions About The Passion of the Christ (Ascension Press, 2004) A Guide to Narnia: 100 Questions About The Chronicles of Narnia: The Lion, the Witch, and the Wardrobe (Ascension Press, 2005)  The Da Vinci Deception: 100 Questions about the Facts and Fiction of The Da Vinci Code (Ascension Press, 2006)  (co-author with Edward Sri) Amazing Grace for Survivors (Ascension Press, 2008). Contributed "All is Forgiven, Sadie Hawkins!". Mary, Mother of the Son (Amazon, 2014)Catholic Controversies: Understanding Church Teachings and Events in History (Moorings Press, 2010)  (Contributed "The Mother of the Son: The Case for Marian Devotion" and "Purgatory: Where is That in the Bible?")Disorientation: The 13 "isms" That Will Send You to Intellectual "La La Land" (Ascension Press, 2010)  (Contributed "Americanism")The Church and New Media: Blogging Converts, Online Activists, and Bishops Who Tweet (Our Sunday Visitor, 2011).  (Contributed "Chapter 4: - Modern Epistles: Blogging the Faith")The Work of Mercy: Being the Hands and Heart of Christ (Servant books, 2012) The Heart of Catholic Prayer: Rediscovering the Our Father and the Hail Mary (Our Sunday Visitor, 2012) Salt and Light: The Commandments, the Beatitudes, and a Joyful Life (Servant books, 2013) The Church's Best-Kept Secret: A Primer on Catholic Social Teaching (New City Press, 2020) 

 Periodicals 
Shea has been published in the National Catholic Register, Our Sunday Visitor, Catholic Weekly, Catholic Answers, St. Anthony Messenger, the American Spectator, Beliefnet, the Catholic World Report, New Oxford Review, The Door, and Catholic Digest.

 Radio 
Shea's one-minute "Words of Encouragement" segments have been broadcast nationally in the United States on Ave Maria Radio.

 Podcasting 
From 2015 to 2018, Shea hosted Connecting the Dots.

 TV 
Shea played Innocent Smith on Dale Ahlquist's television program G. K. Chesterton: The Apostle of Common Sense, on the Eternal Word Television Network (EWTN). 

Shea also appeared on EWTN in the made-for-television film adaptation of Chesterton's play The Surprise, as the captain of the guard.

In addition, Shea appeared on The Journey Home on ETWN.

 Film 
In 2015, Shea appeared in Convinced'', a documentary by Donald J. Johnson on the conversions of over 20 people to the Catholic faith.

References

External links 
 

Converts to Roman Catholicism from Evangelicalism
American Roman Catholic religious writers
Christian apologists
American bloggers
American podcasters
Living people
1958 births
21st-century American non-fiction writers
Catholics from Washington (state)